Fuller is a surname. It originally referred to someone who treats woolen cloth with the process called fulling (a process also known as walking—or waulking in Scotland—and tucking, hence the names Walker and Tucker). Notable people with the surname include:

Acting
Ben Fuller (producer) (1875–1952), English theatre entrepreneur in Australia
Dolores Fuller (1923–2011), American actress and composer, Ed Wood's companion
Drew Fuller (born 1980), American actor
Frances Fuller (1907–1980), American actress
Kurt Fuller (born 1953), American actor
Mary Fuller, American actress
Penny Fuller, American actress

Architecture
Buckminster Fuller (1895–1983), American architect
George A. Fuller (1851–1900), American architect and general contractor, "inventor" of modern skyscrapers
H. E. Fuller (1867–1962), South Australian architect, artist and art critic
Thomas Fuller (architect) (1823–1898), Canadian architect

Art
George Fuller (painter) (1822–1884), American figure and portrait painter
Isaac Fuller (1606(?)–1672), English painter
Meta Vaux Warrick Fuller (1867–1968), American artist
Ron Fuller (artist) (1936–2017), British artist
Victoria Fuller (artist) (born 1953), American artist and sculptor 
Violet Fuller (1920–2006), British artist

Business
Alfred Fuller (1885–1973), Canadian businessman
George F. Fuller (1869–1962), American industrialist
Kathryn S. Fuller, American lawyer and business executive
Samuel Augustus Fuller (1837–1891), American steel industry executive
Samuel B. Fuller (1905–1988), American entrepreneur

Film and television
Chris Fuller (born 1982), American filmmaker
Courtis Fuller (born 1957), American broadcaster
Samuel Fuller (1911–1997), American movie director
Simon Fuller (born 1960), British record and television producer

Medicine
Samuel Fuller (Pilgrim) (c. 1580–1633), English doctor, a founder of the colony at Plymouth, Massachusetts
Thomas Fuller (writer) (1654–1734), English physician and collector of adages in his Gnomologia

Military
Aaron Fuller (military) (1738–1816), American military officer
Ben Hebard Fuller (1870–1937), American general and 15th Commandant of the Marine Corps
Edward Fuller (U.S. Marine Corps officer) (1893–1918), American officer and son of Ben Hebard Fuller
Horace H. Fuller (1886–1966), American soldier
J. F. C. Fuller (1878–1966), British general and military historian
John W. Fuller (1827–1891), American general
Wilfred Fuller (1893–1947), British soldier

Music
Blind Boy Fuller (born Fulton Allen; 1904–1941), American blues guitarist and singer
Bobby Fuller (1942–1966), American rock singer and guitarist
Curtis Fuller (1932–2021), American jazz trombonist
Jesse Fuller (1896–1976), American one-man-band musician
Jim Fuller (musician), American guitarist with The Surfaris
Johnny Fuller (1929–1985), American blues singer and guitarist
Joni Fuller, British musician
Rachel Fuller (born 1973), British musician

Politics and law
Allen C. Fuller (1822–1901), Attorney General of Illinois during the American Civil War
Alvan T. Fuller (1878–1958), American politician from Massachusetts, father of Peter D. Fuller
Charles Eugene Fuller (1849–1926), American congressman for Illinois
Claude A. Fuller (1876–1968), American congressman for Arkansas
David Fuller (politician) (1941–2022), American politician, Montana state senator
DuFay A. Fuller (1852–1924), American businessman and politician in Illinois, brother of Charles Eugene Fuller
George Fuller (Australian politician) (1861–1940), twice Premier of New South Wales, Australia
George Fuller (British politician) (1833–1927), British Liberal politician
George Fuller (congressman) (1802–1888), American congressman for Pennsylvania
Lon L. Fuller (1902–1978), American legal philosopher
Mad Jack Fuller (1757–1834), English politician, philanthropist and patron of the arts
Melville Fuller (1833–1910), eighth Chief Justice of the United States
Oramel B. Fuller (1858–1935), American politician in Michigan
Richard Fuller (Bedford MP), British politician

Religion
Andrew Fuller, British Baptist minister
Charles E. Fuller (Baptist minister) (1887–1968), American preacher and founder of Fuller Theological Seminary
George C. Fuller, American theologian and seminary president
John Fuller (college head), Master of Jesus College, Cambridge (1557–1558)
Peter the Fuller, Patriarch of Antioch
Reginald C. Fuller (1908–2011), British priest and biblical scholar
Thomas Fuller (1608–1661), English cleric and historian, author of Worthies of England

Science and technology
Alison Fuller, British educational researcher
Calvin Fuller (1902–1994), American physical chemist, inventor of the solar cell
Claude Fuller (entomologist) (1872–1928), Australian-born entomologist in South Africa
Edgar Fuller, American mathematician
George M. Fuller (born 1953), American physicist
George W. Fuller (1868–1934), sanitary engineer
Gerald Fuller, American chemical engineer

Sports

Baseball
Dave Fuller (1915–2009), American college baseball coach
Ed Fuller (1869–1935), American baseball pitcher
Frank Fuller (baseball) (1893–1965), American baseball player
Harry Fuller (1862–1895), American baseball player, brother of Shorty Fuller
Jim Fuller (outfielder) (born 1950), American baseball player
Jimmy Fuller (1892–1987), American baseball player in the Negro leagues
John Fuller (born 1950), American baseball player
Nig Fuller (born Charles F. Furrer; 1878–1937), American baseball player
Ryan Fuller (born 1990), American baseball coach
Shorty Fuller (1867–1904), American baseball player, brother of Harry Fuller
Vern Fuller (born 1944), American baseball player

Cricket
Dickie Fuller (1913–1987), Jamaican cricketer
Donald Fuller (1869–1936), New Zealand cricketer
Eddie Fuller (1931–2008), South African cricketer
Edwin Fuller (1850–1917), New Zealand cricketer

Football (gridiron)
Aaron Fuller (American football) (born 1997), American football player
Devin Fuller (born 1994), American football player
Jeff Fuller (safety), American football player
Jordan Fuller (born 1998), American football player
Steve Fuller (American football) (born 1957), American football quarterback

Football (soccer)
Barry Fuller, English footballer
Keysher Fuller, Costa Rican footballer
Ricardo Fuller, Jamaican footballer
Sarah Fuller (athlete) (born 1999), American soccer goalkeeper

Other
Aaron Fuller (basketball) (born 1989), American basketball player
Abigail Fuller (born c. 1960), American Thoroughbred horse jockey
Danny Fuller (surfer) (born 1982), American surfer, photographer, artist and model
Debbie Fuller (born 1966), Canadian diver
Freddy Stephen Fuller, Canadian boxer
Jeff Fuller (racing driver), American racing driver
Nikki Fuller, American bodybuilder and actress
Peter D. Fuller, American Thoroughbred owner and businessman, father of Abigail Fuller
Rick Fuller, American wrestler
Wendy Fuller (born 1965), Canadian diver

Writing
Alexandra Fuller, British writer
Bryan Fuller, American screenwriter
Charles Fuller (born 1939), American playwright
Errol Fuller, English author of several books on extinction
Henry B. Fuller (born 1857), writer
J. Fuller, publisher in 18th century England
Jean Overton Fuller, British biographer
John Fuller (poet) (born 1937), English poet
John G. Fuller, (1913–1990), American author
Margaret Fuller (1810–1850), American journalist and women's rights activist
Peter Fuller (1948–1990), British art critic and writer
Roy Fuller (1912–1991), English poet, father of poet John Fuller
Uriah Fuller, pen name used by American mathematician Martin Gardner

Other
Aaron Fuller (disambiguation), multiple people
David Fuller (born 1954), British murderer and necrophile
Doris Fuller, American bridge player
Edward Fuller (disambiguation), one of several people
Elizabeth Fuller (1644–1709), British benefactress
Ida Fuller (1854–1930), American co-founder of Sigma Kappa sorority
Ida May Fuller (1874–1975), centenarian and first American recipient of social security
Kyle Fuller (disambiguation), multiple people
Loie Fuller (1862–1928), American modern dance pioneer
Maud A. B. Fuller (1868–1972), American educator and missionary
Maxwell Fuller (1945–2013), Australian chess player
Michael Fuller, British chief constable
Millard Fuller, American humanitarian
Minnie Rutherford Fuller, American farmer, broker, temperance leader, suffragist
Robert Fuller (disambiguation), one of several people
Steve Fuller (sociologist), American philosopher
Victoria Fuller (model), American model
William Fuller (disambiguation), one of several people

See also 
 Chris Fuller, fictional character in the American fantasy sitcom Out of This World
 Fuller (disambiguation)
 Fullmer
 Fullerton (disambiguation)

References 

English-language surnames
Occupational surnames
English-language occupational surnames

es:Fuller (apellido)